Taofifénua is a surname. Notable people with the surname include:

Romain Taofifénua (born 1990), French rugby union player
Sébastien Taofifénua (born 1996), French rugby union player
Willy Taofifénua (born 1963), French rugby union player

Surnames of Oceanian origin
French-language surnames